During the 1949–50 English football season, Brentford competed in the Football League Second Division. In his first season as manager, Jackie Gibbons guided the club to a 9th-place finish, a marked improvement on near-relegations in the previous two seasons.

Season summary 

1949–50 marked the first season since 1925–26 that Brentford would play a full season under the management of someone other than Harry Curtis, with former player Jackie Gibbons having taken over as manager in February 1949. A new-look squad toured Sweden under Gibbons in pre-season, with new forward signings Ken Coote, Jimmy Hill and Dennis Rampling in attendance. Joe Crozier, the club's near-ever-present goalkeeper since September 1937, elected to retire from full-time football and was replaced by his backups, firstly Ted Gaskell and then Alf Jefferies.

Brentford had a mixed season in the Second Division, with just three victories in the opening 15 matches leaving the club out of contention for challenging for promotion. A turnaround in form elevated the Bees from 21st place on 5 November 1949, to a season-high 7th on 8 April 1950. Two losses, a win and a draw from the final four matches dropped the club a final position of 9th. Brentford finished the campaign having conceded only 12 league goals at Griffin Park, the best home record in each of the top two divisions.

League table

Results
Brentford's goal tally listed first.

Legend

Football League Second Division

FA Cup

 Sources: Statto, 11v11, 100 Years Of Brentford

Playing squad 
Players' ages are as of the opening day of the 1949–50 season.

 Sources: 100 Years Of Brentford, Timeless Bees

Coaching staff

Statistics

Appearances and goals

Players listed in italics left the club mid-season.
Source: 100 Years Of Brentford

Goalscorers 

Players listed in italics left the club mid-season.
Source: 100 Years Of Brentford

Amateur international caps

Management

Summary

Transfers & loans 
Cricketers are not included in this list.

References 

Brentford F.C. seasons
Brentford